Mathew Ulakamthara was a Malayalam language writer, literary critic and academic from Kerala, India. He received several awards including Sabha Rathnam, the highest honor of the Syro-Malabar Church.

Biography
Mathew Ulakamthara was born on June 6, 1931, in Chungam Ulakamthara house in present-day Arattukulam in Vaikom, Kottayam district of Kerala to Ulakamthra Varkey and Anna. In 1954, he obtained a degree in Malayalam from the University of Kerala and later did his Post Graduate Degree from the University of Madras. He served as Malayalam lecturer at Thevara SH College for three decades and retired as head of the department in 1986. After retirement he worked as teacher at Mananthavady Newman's College. He was later appointed  Honorary Professor of Sree Sankaracharya Sanskrit University. He also served as the sub-editor of Thananthu magazine and Editor-in-Chief of Deepika Weekly (1988-1990).

Mathew has also served as the Chief Examiner, Chairman of the Examination Board, Textbook Committee Member, Oriental Faculty and chairman of the Board of Studies of Kerala and MG Universities.

Personal life and death
Mathew was an Eastern Rite Catholic affiliated with the Syro-Malabar Church. He and his wife Thresiamma have four children. He died on 24 February 2022, at a private hospital in Thellakam, Kottayam district.

Literary contributions
When he was 12 years old, his first work was published in Deepika Weekly Children's page. At the time of writing the articles in Kerala Pamkthi magazine under the name Vaikkom V. Mathew, its editor, Father C. K. Mattam, suggested that the family name be added to his name. After that he started writing under the name Mathew Ulakamthara.

Mathew has authored over fifty works in various genres including Literary Criticism, Poetry, Drama, Biography and Religious Thought. His introductions to the works of many authors including Vaikom Muhammad Basheer, Pala Narayanan Nair and Mary John Thottam are also noteworthy. These will be published in book form soon.

Mathew's main literary work is the epic Christugatha (meaning: The Story of Christ), which is a poem that gives a comprehensive and aesthetic account of the life and teachings of Jesus Christ from his birth to his ascension to heaven. Six editions of this book have been released. He has also authored several Christian devotional songs. His literary criticism books have been made textbooks by three universities in Kerala. The books used as texts were Vimarshasopanam, Alochanamritham, and Sahithyapeedika.

Mathew has been a member of the Kerala Sahitya Akademi, Secretary of the Kerala Sasthra Sahithya Parishad and a member of the advisory board of the Kerala Bhasha Institute.

Selected works

Christian philosophy

Poetry
Christugatha
Velichathinte Makal (meaning: Daughter of Light)
Adyathe Maranam (meaning: First Death)

Literary criticism
Vimarshasopanam

Religious
 (meaning: Universal light). Poetic Drama on life of Jesus Christ.
Veerambana Kathakal
 (meaning: Hinduism and Christianity)
Mar Apreminte Mariya Geethangal
Christu Bimbangal Malayalathil (meaning: Christ Images in Malayalam)

Biography

 Based on life of Johann Ernst Hanxleden.

Indira Gandhi, life of former Indian Prime Minister Indira Gandhi

Essays
 (meaning: Bitter and Sweet)

Others

 (meaning: Heaven of Cowards)

Awards and honors
K. V. Simon Award
A.K.C.C. Award
Athansius Award
Marthoma Award
Vanisseri Award
Ulloor Award
Mahakavi Kattakkayam Gold Medal
KCBC Award
Catholic Congress Award
KCYM Award
Kudumbadeepam Award
LRC Award
Sr Mary Baneenja Award
IC Chacko Award
Syro-Malabar Research Center Award 2011
In 2019, he received the title Sabha Rathnam (meaning: gem of the church) the highest honor of the Syro-Malabar Church.

Works on him
 (meaning: Ulakamthara, poet and critic:studies). Study on works of Mathew Ulakamthara.

References

1931 births
2022 deaths
Eastern Catholic poets
Malayalam-language writers
Indian literary critics
Malayalam literary critics
Indian male poets
Malayali people
Poets from Kerala
Malayalam poets
20th-century Indian poets
20th-century Indian male writers
People from Kottayam district
University of Madras alumni
University of Kerala alumni
Syro-Malabar Catholics